In Hinduism and Sikhism, a samadhi or samadhi mandir is a temple, shrine, or memorial commemorating the dead (similar to a tomb or mausoleum), which may or may not contain the body of the deceased. Samadhi sites are often built in this way to honour people regarded as saints or gurus in Hindu religious traditions, wherein such souls are said to have passed into mahāsamādhi, or were already in samadhi (a state of meditative consciousness) at the time of death.

In Sikhism, the term "samadhi" is used for the mausoleums of eminent figures, both religious and political. Examples include the Samadhi of Ranjit Singh in Lahore, and that of Maharaja Sher Singh near Lahore. Hindu equivalents are usually called chatri, although those for Maratha Empire figures also often use "samadhi". The forms of structure called "samadhi" vary greatly. The word is sometimes used for a memorial stele, also called paliya, a type of hero stone once common in parts of Gujarat and Sindh. It may be used for small memorial buildings such as open chatri, often placed around a temple.

The tradition of India is cremation for most Hindu people at the time of death, while samadhi is generally reserved for very advanced souls, such as yogis and saints, who have already been "purified by the fire of yoga" or who are believed to have been in the state of samadhi at the time of death. Samadhi usually involves inhumation rather than cremation.

Examples
One of the popular site of pilgrimage in India is the town of Alandi in the state of Maharashtra where the 13th century Varkari saint Dnyaneshwar took Sanjivan Samadhi or entombed himself in the state of Samadhi. His devotees believe that he is still alive.

A. C. Bhaktivedanta Swami Prabhupada (d. 1977) the founder of ISKCON (known as the "Hare Krishna Movement"), is commemorated with a large Samadhi Mandir in
Mayapur, West Bengal.

See also
 Stupa

References

Bibliography

External links

 
 Spiritual Travel – Samadhis of the Sages

 
 
Monuments and memorials in India
Religious buildings and structures in India
Hindu architecture
Hindu practices
Burial monuments and structures